was a town located in Ōshima District, Yamaguchi Prefecture, Japan.

As of 2003, the town had an estimated population of 5,649 and a density of 195.81 persons per km2. The total area was 28.85 km2.

On October 1, 2004, Tachibana, along with the towns of Kuka, Ōshima and Tōwa (all from Ōshima District), was merged to create the town of Suō-Ōshima.

External links
 Official website of Suō-Ōshima (in Japanese)

Dissolved municipalities of Yamaguchi Prefecture